Eremophila capricornica is a flowering plant in the figwort family, Scrophulariaceae and is endemic to Western Australia. It is a small shrub with woolly branches, grey, hairy leaves and mauve to lilac-coloured flowers with hairy sepals.

Description
The 4 stamens are enclosed by the petal tube. Flowering time is mainly from June to August.

Taxonomy and naming
Eremophila capricornica was first formally described by Bevan Buirchell and Andrew Brown in 2016 and the description was published in Nuytsia. The specific epithet (capricornica) refers to the Tropic of Capricorn near which this species occurs.

Distribution and habitat
This eremophila is found between Newman and Jigalong in the Gascoyne biogeographic region growing in Acacia shrubland with a grassy understorey.

Conservation status
Eremophila capricornica has been classified as "Priority One" by the Government of Western Australia Department of Parks and Wildlife, meaning that it is known from only one or a few locations which are potentially at risk.

References

capricornica
Eudicots of Western Australia
Plants described in 2016